Jek carpets – is a term used for lint-free and pile carpets woven by Jek people living in Quba Rayon, Azerbaijan. These carpets are included in the Kuba group of Shirvan type and are named in honour of Jek village of Quba Rayon. Foreign art critics mistakenly called these carpets "Dagestani".

References

External links
 Лятиф Керимов, «Азербайджанский ковер» (Том II), Баку, «Гянджлик», 1983, ст. 189—190, табл. 28. 
 «Джек»: Художественный анализ. Технические особенности.

Azerbaijani rugs and carpets